Geoffrey Twentyman (born 10 March 1959) is an English former professional footballer, who is now the main sports presenter for BBC Radio Bristol & BBC Radio Somerset

The son of former Liverpool player Geoff Twentyman, Geoff Jr. began his career as a trainee at his father's club, but after failing to make the grade there he played for Formby before being sold on to Chorley for around £1,000 and from there to Preston North End. After making 98 league appearances for Preston, scoring four goals, he was released by the Lancashire club, and was signed by Bristol Rovers. He was taken to Rovers by Bobby Gould, and was later managed by Gerry Francis, playing a total of 252 league games, scoring six goals, and made a Wembley appearance in the final of the Associate Members' Cup in 1990. Twentyman began coaching youth football with Brimsham Green F.C. in Yate shortly after moving to Bristol, and is now the club's honorary president.

When Francis left Rovers in 1991, Twentyman applied for the vacant manager's job, but was not appointed.

After the end of his playing career he studied at Bristol Polytechnic and then joined Radio Bristol as a sports journalist. In 1993, he became the sports editor of Radio Bristol.

When Ian Holloway became the manager of Bristol Rovers in 1996, Twentyman joined him as assistant manager. The job wasn't to his liking and he returned to his previous job in 1997.

On 22 June 2008, he played for Bristol Rovers in the inaugural Western Masters, where the team finished third of the four teams competing.

In late 2015 it was announced Twentyman would leave the Drivetime show he'd been presenting on Radio Bristol and instead present a nightly sports show every weekday between 6-7pm, in addition to his presenting duties on Saturday Sport.

References

1959 births
Living people
English footballers
Association football defenders
English Football League players
Formby F.C. players
Chorley F.C. players
Preston North End F.C. players
Bristol Rovers F.C. players
Yate Town F.C. players
Linfield F.C. players
NIFL Premiership players
British sports broadcasters
BBC people
Alumni of the University of the West of England, Bristol
Footballers from Liverpool
Radio presenters from Liverpool